Immanuel Lutheran Church is an LCMS (Lutheran Church–Missouri Synod) church in Perryville, Missouri.

Name
The original name, Immanuel Evangelical Lutheran Church of Perryville, followed the German tradition of using the word “Evangelical”, meaning ‘Protestant’, as part of the name.

History
Immanuel Lutheran Church in Perryville was founded by Bavarian Lutherans who settled Perry County in 1839. These Bavarian Lutherans did not come in one large colony as the Saxon Lutherans had, but instead settled one or several families at a time.  The first Lutheran Bavarian settler, George Bergmann, also known as “Creek Georg”, settled along the Cinque Homme Creek just a little to the north of Highway 61.  In 1840, Pastor Gruber of Uniontown ministered to these Bavarian Lutherans and helped them establish the Peace Lutheran Church parish in Friedenberg in 1844.  The first Friedenberg church stood to the north of the Cingue Homme bridge on Highway 61. In 1851, a new church was built on the Frankenberg, south of the Friedenberg cemetery.  A number of Lutheran Bavarians settled to the north of Perryville, but belonged to the Friedenberg church. By 1862, the Lutheran Bavarians were meeting in the Sandler House in Perryville for their Sunday services rather than making the trip to Friedenberg.  In March, 1866, a number of them had formed a Schul-Gemeinde (a congregation for the purpose of setting up a school) for providing a Christian education in both German and English to their children.  They also requested to be relinquished from the Friedenberg congregation for the purpose of founding their own church.  At first, divine services and meetings were held in the Perry County Court House and in the old Methodist church to the north of the Monitor Building.  In 1867, the first building was built which served both as church and school.  Pastor Friedrich Besel of the Friedenberg congregation provided pastoral services until the congregation could find their own pastor.  In 1869, the Evangelical Lutheran Synod of Missouri, Ohio, and other States assigned reverend Chas H. Demetrio to serve the congregation in Perryville.  In 1894, a new church was erected, with the old church serving as the parochial school.  English services were introduced in 1921, and by 1963 services were being held in English-only.

School
Immanuel Lutheran Church operates a Lutheran parochial school, Immanuel Lutheran School.  The school instructs students from PK and K-8.

External links
 Official website

References

Lutheran Church–Missouri Synod churches
1839 establishments in Missouri
Churches in Perry County, Missouri
Buildings and structures in Perryville, Missouri